Inzapur village is located in Wardha tehsil of Wardha district in Maharashtra. inzapur is also a gram panchayat. It is situated 4 km away from district headquarter Wardha and 4 km away from sub-district headquarter Wardha. the total population of the village is 2110, there are 551 households in the village and Wardha is the nearest town to the village.

References 

Villages in Wardha district